SBB may refer to:

Arts and entertainment 

 SBB (band), a Polish progressive rock band, or their self-titled albums:
 SBB (1974 album)
 SBB (1978 album, Amiga)
 Seán Bán Breathnach, also known as SBB, Irish TV personality
 Saas Bahu aur Betiyaan, a television programme on the Indian channel Aaj Tak
 Soldier Boy Ben, a superhero in the third season of The Boys television series

Companies 
 Swiss Federal Railways, 
 Serbia Broadband, a cable television and broadband internet service provider in Serbia

Technology 
 Solid bleached board, a paperboard grade
 Storage Building Block, an individual tape or disk drive component used in a computer data storage array or library
 SwiftBroadband, a satellite-based communication network for aircraft
 Screened Bottom Board, also known as Open Mesh Floor, a device used to protect beehives from Varroa destructor mites

Others 
 Saxon Climbers' Federation, now part of the German Alpine Club
 Berlin State Library
 Union for a Better Future of BiH, Bosnian political party